Wohlleben is a surname. Notable people with the name include:

Peter Wohlleben (born 1964), German forester and author
Ralf Wohlleben (born 1975), German Neo-Nazi
 (born 1944), German politician

See also
Wohllebe

German-language surnames
Surnames from nicknames